KJOP (1240 AM) is a radio station broadcasting a Catholic talk format. Licensed to Lemoore, California, United States, it serves the Visalia-Tulare area. The station is owned by Relevant Radio, Inc.

External links

 
 
 

Mass media in Tulare County, California
Relevant Radio stations
JOP